Back on the Street is the final major-label album by American singer-songwriter Robert John.

Track listing
"(So Long) Since I Felt This Way"
"Hey There Lonely Girl"
"Just One More Try"
"On My Own"
"Give Up Your Love"
"Sherry"
"Winner Take All"
"Hurtin' Doesn't Go Away"
"Back on the Street Again"
"You Could Have Told Me"

Personnel
Robert John – vocals
George Tobin in association with Mike Piccirillo – production

Production
Arranged, produced and mixed by George Tobin and Mike Piccirillo.
Recorded by Mark Wolfson and H. Lee Wolen.

References 

1980 albums
Robert John albums
EMI America Records albums